Andreas Ioannides (1958 – 11 July 2011) was the head of the Cyprus Navy until his death in the Evangelos Florakis Navy Base explosion, which took place at the Evangelos Florakis Navy Base on July 11, 2011.

Career
A Greek Cypriot, Ioannides was born in Rizokarpaso in 1958, entered the Hellenic Naval Academy in 1977 and graduated in 1981 as an Ensign. 
He then underwent additional training at various Greek special forces facilities and command and staff schools.

Ioannides served as an officer on board warships, as CO of the MM40 Exocet batteries, as head of the Staff and Operations Directorate of the Cyprus Naval Command, head of the Coastal Surveillance Command, head of the Warships Command and Deputy Commander of the Cyprus Naval Command, before being appointed as Commander of the Naval Command on 20 August 2008, taking over from Captain Panayotis Vougioulakis.

References

|-

1958 births
2011 deaths
Cyprus Navy personnel
Accidental deaths in Cyprus
Commanders of the Order of Merit of the Italian Republic
Deaths by explosive device